is a passenger railway station located in  Higashi-ku, Sakai, Osaka Prefecture, Japan, operated by the private railway operator Nankai Electric Railway. It has the station number "NK62".

Lines

Layout
The station consists of two opposed side platforms connected by a footbridge. After an accident at the door of a local train in 2007, the platform display was reconstructed, and then the height of the platforms were raised in 2008 and elevators were installed in 2009.

Platforms

Adjacent stations

History
Hagiharatenjin Station opened on October 10, 1912.

Passenger statistics
In fiscal 2019, the station was used by an average of 7550 passengers daily.

Surrounding area
Hagiwara Shrine
Higashi Ward Office, Sakai
Sakai City Fire Bureau Higashi Fire Station
the Church of God in Japan Minami-Sakai Church

See also
 List of railway stations in Japan

References

External links

  

Railway stations in Japan opened in 1912
Railway stations in Osaka Prefecture
Sakai, Osaka